Erik Holtan (born 20 April 1969) is a retired Norwegian football goalkeeper, who played the majority of his career for Odd Grenland..

He made his debut in the Norwegian Premier League in 1990, when he played for Kongsvinger IL. From 1995 he played for Odd Grenland and remained one of the main profiles until he was replaced by Rune Jarstein after suffering an injury in the 2005 season. He then moved back to his hometown club Moss FK. During the final practice before the kick-off of the 2007 season in Norwegian football Holtan had a career-ending injury and retired a year prematurely. He went on to work as a goalkeeper coach for Moss.

Erik Holtan was capped six times for Norway, and won the 2002 Kniksen award as goalkeeper of the year.

References

External links

Kniksen Award winners
Norwegian footballers
Norway international footballers
1969 births
Living people
Kongsvinger IL Toppfotball players
Odds BK players
Moss FK players
Eliteserien players
People from Moss, Norway
Association football goalkeepers
Sportspeople from Viken (county)